Lubomír Buchta (born 16 May 1967 in Nové Město na Moravě) is a Czech cross-country skier who competed from 1989 to 1999. Competing in three Winter Olympics, his best finish was seventh in the 4 × 10 km relay at Albertville in 1992 while his best individual finish was 13th twice (30 km: 1992, 50 km: 1998).

Buchta's best finish at the FIS Nordic World Ski Championships was fifth in the 10 km event at Val di Fiemme in 1991. His best World Cup finish was third in a 50 km event in Norway in 1992.

Buchta earned four FIS race victories up to 15 km from 1994 to 1997.

Cross-country skiing results
All results are sourced from the International Ski Federation (FIS).

Olympic Games

World Championships

World Cup

Season standings

Individual podiums
 1 podium

Team podiums
 1 podium – (1 )

References

External links

Olympic 4 x 10 km relay results: 1936-2002 

1967 births
Czech male cross-country skiers
Olympic cross-country skiers of Czechoslovakia
Olympic cross-country skiers of the Czech Republic
Cross-country skiers at the 1992 Winter Olympics
Cross-country skiers at the 1994 Winter Olympics
Cross-country skiers at the 1998 Winter Olympics
Living people
People from Nové Město na Moravě
Sportspeople from the Vysočina Region